José Alberto Guzmán Mirabal (born April 9, 1963) is a former professional baseball player who pitched in the Major Leagues from  to .

Career
Guzmán was signed by the Texas Rangers as an amateur free agent on February 10, . He made his major league debut on September 10, 1985, against the Oakland Athletics. He remained with the Rangers for six seasons, winning the  MLB Comeback Player of the Year Award after improving from an 11–13 season to 13–7 in 1991.

In December, Guzmán signed as a free agent with the Chicago Cubs. On April 6, in defeating the Atlanta Braves 1–0 at Wrigley Field, Guzmán had a no-hitter broken up by an Otis Nixon single with two out in the ninth—the only hit he would allow.

He remained with the Cubs for one more season pitching his final game on May 23, 1994. He was under contract through 1996, but injuries prevented him for making a comeback.

Since 2004, Guzmán has worked as a Spanish language radio broadcaster for the Rangers. He also holds a charity golf tournament for Alzheimer patients each October.

See also
 List of Texas Rangers Opening Day starting pitchers

References

External links

Guzman loses no-hit bid in the 9th
Guzmán comments on Iván Rodríguez on El Nuevo Día

1963 births
Living people
Burlington Rangers players
Chicago Cubs players
Daytona Cubs players
Fort Worth Cats players
Gulf Coast Cubs players
Gulf Coast Rangers players
Iowa Cubs players
Major League Baseball broadcasters
Major League Baseball pitchers
Major League Baseball players from Puerto Rico
Oklahoma City 89ers players
People from Santa Isabel, Puerto Rico
Charlotte Rangers players
Tacoma Rainiers players
Texas Rangers (baseball) announcers
Texas Rangers players
Tulsa Drillers players